Robert F. Fudali is an American geochemist.

Biography 
In 1960 Fudali got his doctorate in geochemistry from Pennsylvania State University. He worked for Bellcom from 1962–1966, and later joined the National Museum of Natural History, following by Department of Mineral Sciences in 1966. He was famous for his researches in geochemistry, meteoritics, and petrology.

Works 
 Mineral Sciences Investigations

References 

Eberly College of Science alumni
American geochemists
Smithsonian Institution people
Living people
Year of birth missing (living people)